Keith Edward Wright (born April 13, 1944) is a Canadian former professional ice hockey right winger who played in one NHL game for the Philadelphia Flyers during the 1967–68 NHL season. Wright was born in Aurora, Ontario. Other than his one shot during his time playing for the Philadelphia Flyers, he did not collect any more stats.

See also
List of players who played only one game in the NHL

References

External links
 

1944 births
Living people
Canadian ice hockey right wingers
Canadian people of Scottish descent
Sportspeople from Aurora, Ontario
Oklahoma City Blazers (1965–1977) players
Omaha Knights (CHL) players
Peterborough Petes (ice hockey) players
Philadelphia Flyers players
Quebec Aces (AHL) players
San Francisco Seals (ice hockey) players
Ice hockey people from Ontario
Canadian expatriate ice hockey players in the United States